Martin Brod (Serbian Cyrillic: Мартин Брод) is a village in the municipality of Bihać, Bosnia and Herzegovina. It is mostly known for its proximity to Una National Park, which is Bosnia and Herzegovina's largest national park.

Demographics 
According to the 2013 census, its population was 124.

Gallery

References

Populated places in Bihać